The 1990–91 season of the former DDR-Oberliga, renamed NOFV-Oberliga for this season, was the last season of the top East German league.

After the season, all East German leagues were dissolved and their teams placed in the German football league system. The top two teams joined the Bundesliga, while those ranked third through sixth went to the 2. Bundesliga. The bottom two teams remained in the NOFV-Oberliga, which absorbed all but the relegated teams of the former East German second tier DDR-Liga (also renamed NOFV-Liga) and joined the German league system at the third tier. The seventh through twelfth placed teams were drawn into a playoff with the two NOFV-Liga group champions for two additional 2. Bundesliga places, with unsuccessful teams also remaining in the NOFV-Oberliga.

The competition was contested by 14 teams. Hansa Rostock won the championship and Dynamo Dresden came in second, thus claiming the other available qualification for the Bundesliga. A total of 8 Eastern teams remained professional into both two national German championships.

League standings

Results

Top goalscorers

2. Bundesliga play-off 
The 7th through 12th placed clubs were joined by the winners of the two second-tier NOFV-Liga groups, Union Berlin and FSV Zwickau. The teams were drawn into two groups of four, with the group champions qualifying for the 1991–92 2. Bundesliga.

Group 1

Group 2

Championship-winning squad

Below is the squad of the league champions, Hansa Rostock. They were coached by Uwe Reinders.

External links 
RSSSF, accessdate 3 May 2012
 NOFV-Online – official website of the North-East German Football Association 

NOFV-Oberliga seasons
Ober
1990-91
1